The Crivadia is a left tributary of the river Strei in Romania. It flows into the Strei in Baru.

References

Rivers of Romania
Rivers of Hunedoara County